Carlos Balcells is a Spanish Filipino bass guitar player, businessman and former politician, most notable for his work as the bass guitarist of Filipino rock band The Dawn.

The Dawn
An heir to an affluent family, Balcells joined the band in 1985 after bassist Clay Luna left for the United States. He has performed  on live rock concerts and he has been a part of seven studio albums, one live album and 2 compilation albums released by The Dawn within the 18 years that he was the bassist. The album releases include hit songs like Enveloped Ideas, Salamat, and Iisang Bangka Tayo. However, in 2003, he had to quit the band since he had to go back to his province in Negros Occidental to work in their family business and had a short stint as a politician. He was replaced by Mon Legaspi, bass player for Wolfgang.

On June 7, 2016, Balcells along with Francis Reyes rejoined after Buddy Zabala who left the band on the same day. Thus, making a quintet again for the first time since 2004. His return was short-lived as he was unavailable in later dates for June and July 2016. He was briefly replaced by former bassist Mon Legaspi, who would later begin touring with them months later and would eventually be the band's regular bassist due to the dissolution of Wolfgang and Balcells being mostly pre-occupied with their family businesses. He would eventually return for some anniversary shows in 2017.

Discography
The Dawn
The Dawn (1986)
I Stand With You (1988)
Beyond the Bend (1989)
Heart's Thunder (1990) 
Abot Kamay (1992)
Puno't Dulo (1994) 
Prodigal Sun (2000)

References

Living people
Filipino bass guitarists
Year of birth missing (living people)
People from Negros Occidental
Filipino people of Spanish descent